Veronica Raimo (born 1978) is an Italian writer, translator, and screenwriter.

Biography 
Born in Rome in 1978, she earned a degree in literature with a thesis on German cinema. After graduation, she lived in Berlin, working as a researcher at  Humboldt University.

She is sister of the writer Christian Raimo.

Career 
After working as a translator from English for several publishing houses, she published the novel Il dolore secondo Matteo in 2007. This debut was followed by two more novels, stories published in magazines and anthologies, and a collection of short stories published in Germany, Eines Tages alles dir.

The Girl at the Door, published in October 2019 by Grove Atlantic, is her first novel to be translated into English.

In 2012 she co-wrote the film Bella addormentata ("Sleeping Beauty") directed by Marco Bellocchio, receiving a 2013 Nastri d'argento (Silver Ribbon) nomination for best screenplay.

Her articles and reviews have appeared in magazines and newspapers including Rolling Stone, la Repubblica XL, il manifesto, Corriere della Sera and Amica.

Works
 Il dolore secondo Matteo, Roma : Minimum fax, 2007. 
 Tutte le feste di domani,  Milano : Rizzoli, 2013. 
 Miden : romanzo, Milano : Mondadori, 2018. 
 Le bambinacce,  Milano : Feltrinelli, settembre 2019. 
 Lezioni di anatomia : il corpo umano in quindici storie, Roma : Minimum fax, 2019. 
 Niente di vero, Torino : Einaudi, 2022. 

Works in English
 The girl at the door London : 4th Estate, 2020.

References

Living people
1978 births
Italian screenwriters
Italian translators
Writers from Rome